Sesam, SESAM or SeSaM may refer to:

 SESAM (database), a relational database developed by Fujitsu Siemens
 SESAM (FEM), a structural analysis software
 Sesam (search engine), a Scandinavian internet search engine
 SeSaM-Biotech GmbH, a biotechnology company focusing on protein engineering
 Semiconductor saturable-absorber mirror, a component used in some lasers
 Sequence saturation mutagenesis (SeSaM), a molecular biology method for diversity creation by random mutagenesis

See also
 Sesame (disambiguation)
 Various wild and cultivated plants in the genus Sesamum